Heugel can refer to:
 Heugel, French music publishing house, founded in 1839, later part of Éditions Alphonse Leduc

Surname
  (c. 1510 – c. 1585), German composer
 Henri Heugel, music publisher, son of Heugel´s founder Jacques-Léopold Heugel
 Michael Heugel, guitarist for Battlecross